Mélanie Bernard (born 14 September 1974) is a former professional tennis player from Canada.

Biography
A right-handed player from Quebec, Bernard had a best singles ranking of 253.

Bernard was most successful as a doubles player, ranked as high as 90 in the world, often partnering with Caroline Delisle. She and Delisle made the round of 16 at the 1994 French Open. The pair also competed together in the main draw of the 1995 Wimbledon Championships and took a set off top seeds Gigi Fernández and Natasha Zvereva in a first round loss.

ITF finals

Doubles (4–6)

References

External links
 
 

1974 births
Living people
Canadian female tennis players
Racket sportspeople from Quebec
Sportspeople from Saguenay, Quebec